"The Man with the Bag" may refer to:

 The Sack Man, a mythical figure
  "(Everybody's Waitin' for) The Man with the Bag", a Christmas song
  "The Man with the Bag", an episode of Ally McBeal